Shōichi Watanabe (April 21, 1930 – September 29, 2000) was a Japanese politician. He served in the House of Representatives of Japan as part of the multi-member constituency Hokkaido's 4th district alongside Yukio Hatoyama and Tadamasa Kodaira. He was a member of the Liberal Democratic Party of Japan.

Bibliography
日外アソシエーツ編『政治家人名事典』（紀伊国屋書店、1990年）

Politicians from Hokkaido
1930 births
2000 deaths